The Mongolian National Premier League (Mongolian: Монголын Үндэсний Дээд Лиг), also known as the Hisense Premier League for sponsorship reasons, is the top-tier professional football league of Mongolia. It is contested by ten clubs and operates on a system of promotion and relegation with the 1st League. The league is controlled by the Mongolian Football Federation.

The inaugural season started in 1955. Seasons start in late April and last until late October or early November. Teams play 18 matches each (playing each team in the league twice, home and away), totalling 90 matches in the season.

Format
The National League is a standalone football competition, that operates as the highest level of football in Mongolia. It consists of ten teams, eight of which are based in the capital city, Ulaanbaatar, with the remainder coming from other districts. Competing teams in the league play each other twice on a home and away basis. 6 of the Ulaanbaatar-located teams play at the MFF Football Centre, and the others are: Mongolian largest stadium, National Sports Stadium, G-Mobile Arena, Erchim Stadium & Erdenet Stadium.

Three points are gained for a win and one for a draw with no points for a loss. The team with the highest number of points is declared the champion. If two teams finish on equal points then head-to-head is used to determine the winner, with goals scored being the next criterion considered if goal difference cannot separate the teams.

There is no promotion, because it is the top-tier league in Mongolia but there is relegation. The last-placed 2 teams are automatically relegated to Mongolia 1st League, without a play-off match.

History 
The football matches were introduced since 1946 in Mongolia. Then the first official championship was held in 1955, named "Mongolian National Championship". Later in 1996, the league name changed to "Mongolian National Premier League".

Information from the 1950s to the 2000 such as results and teams are not known, only the winners (some runner-ups and third placed teams) are known. There are many teams in Mongolian football leagues history, including Soyol, Khudulmur and Tengeriin Bugnuud.

List of winners

1955: Soyol
1956–63: Not known
1964: Khudulmur (Ulaanbaatar)
1965: No tournament
1966: Darkhan
1968: Darkhan
1970: Aldar (Army Sports Club)
1972: Khudulmur (Ulaanbaatar)
1974: Aldar (Army Sports Club)
1976: Aldar (Army Sports Club)
1978: Zamchin (Railwaymen)
1980: Aldar (Army Sports Club)
1983: Khudulmur (Ulaanbaatar)
1985: Khuch (Police Sports Club)
1986: Not known
1987: Sükhbaatar (Ulaanbaatar)
1989: Khudulmur (Ulaanbaatar)
1990: Sükhbaatar (Ulaanbaatar)
1991: SOR (Ulaanbaatar)
1992: IDSSKh (Mongolian All-University Team)
1993: Udriin Od (Ulaanbaatar)
1994: Erchim (Ulaanbaatar)
1995: Idsskh (Mongolian All-University Team)
1996: Erchim (Ulaanbaatar)
1997: Delger (Ulaanbaatar)
1998: Erchim (Ulaanbaatar)
1999: ITI Bank-Bars (Ulaanbaatar)
2000: Erchim  (Ulaanbaatar)
2001: Khangarid (Erdenet)
2002: Erchim (Ulaanbaatar)
2003: Khangarid (Erdenet)
2004: Khangarid (Erdenet)
2005: Khoromkhon (Ulaanbaatar)
2006: Khasiin Khulguud (Ulaanbaatar) (unofficial)
2007: Erchim (Ulaanbaatar)
2008: Erchim (Ulaanbaatar)
2009: Ulaanbaataryn Unaganuud
2010: Khangarid (Erdenet)
2011: Ulaanbaatar
2012: Erchim (Ulaanbaatar)
2013: Erchim (Ulaanbaatar)
2014: Khoromkhon (Ulaanbaatar)
2015: Erchim (Ulaanbaatar)
2016: Erchim (Ulaanbaatar)
2017: Erchim (Ulaanbaatar)
2018: Erchim (Ulaanbaatar)
2019: Ulaanbaatar City (Ulaanbaatar)
2020: Athletic 220 FC (Ulaanbaatar)
2021: Athletic 220 FC (Ulaanbaatar)
2022: Erchim (Ulaanbaatar)

Source:

Performances

Top goalscorers

Hat-tricks

References

External links
Mongolian Football Central
Mongolian Premier League summary (SOCCERWAY)

 
Football competitions in Mongolia
Top level football leagues in Asia
Sports leagues established in 1955
1955 establishments in Mongolia